(12 August 1926 – 31 May 2015) was a Japanese actor, best known for his starring role in the 1955 film Godzilla Raids Again as well as other Toho Studios monster movies. He was born in Japan. He is a graduate of Keio University in Tokyo.

In a 1999 interview with Steve Ryfle, Koizumi laments that while he stated he has easy parts to play, he felt he could have done more in his performances. Despite his roles where he usually plays a scientist, he plays a powerful role in Late Chrysanthemums, playing a young man that married an older wealthy woman to escape from the slums. On 31 May 2015, Koizumi died at a hospital in Tokyo from pneumonia at the age of 88.

Filmography

Film

 Seishun kaigi (1952) - Shôgo Murase
 Rakki-san (1952)
 Kin no tamago: Golden girl (1952)
 Wakai hito (1952)
 Tôkyô no koibito (1952) - Shôtarô
 Kekkon annai (1952)
 Minato e kita otoko (1952) - Shingo Nishizawa
 Itou shain-santô jyûyaku kyodaihen (1953)
 Fukeyo haru kaze (1953) - The young man
 Hoyo (1953) - Yoshikawa, alias Sampei
 Pu-san (1953)
 Aijô ni tsuite (1953) - Akira Murase
 Jirochô sangokushi: Jirochô to Ishimatsu (1953)
 Jirochô sangokushi: seizoroi Shimizu Minato (1953)
 Tokai no yokogao (1953)
 Shirauo (1953) - Sumida
 Kofuku-san (1953)
 Hana no naka no musumetachi (1953) - Jun'ichi Mimura
 Jirochô sangokushi: hatsu iwai Shimizu Minato (1954)
 Mama no nikki (1954)
 Jirochô sangokushi: kaitô-ichi no abarenbô (1954)
 Late Chrysanthemums (1954) - Kiyoshi
 Haha no hatsukoi (1954)
 Josei ni kansuru jûni shô (1954) - Koheita Kure
 Koi-gesho (1955) - Ishjina
 Ashita no kôfuku (1955) - Toshio Matsuzaki
 Mekura neko (1955)
 Tsuki ni tobu kari (1955) - Amemiya
 Godzilla Raids Again (1955) - Shoichi Tsukioka
 Oen-san (1955) - Hiroshi Matsuyama
 Ryanko no Yatarô (1955) - Ryanko no Yatarô
 Kuchizuke (1955) - Eikichi Uemura- The Girl in Mist (segment 2)
 Sugata naki mokugekisha (1955) - Detective Funaki
 Aoi hate (1955) - Jiro Tamura
 Ankokugai (1955) - Yumiko's fiancé
 Migotona musume (1956) - Shirô Yukimra
 Nyôbô zoku wa uttaeru (1956) - Junji Komiya
 Kon'yaku sanbagarasu (1956) - Taniyama
 Ôabare Cha-Cha musume (1956)
 Shujinsen (1956)
 Hesokuri shacho to wanman shacho: Hesokuri shacho kanto su (1956)
 Sazae-san (1956) - Masuo Fuguta
 Bôkyaku no hanabira (1957)
 Yama to kawa no aru machi (1957)
 Kono futari ni sachi are (1957)
 Zoku Sazae-san (1957) - Fuguta
 Sanjûrokunin no jôkyaku (1957) - Ichirô Watanabe - Detective
 Nikui mono (1957) - Mr Kurata
 Bôkyaku no hanabira: Kanketsuhen (1957)
 A Farewell to the Woman Called My Sister (1957)
 Wakare no chatsumi-uta shimai-hen: Oneesan to yonda hito (1957)
 Hanayome ha mateirû (1957)
 Sazae-san no seishun (1957) - Fuguta
 Aijô no miyako (1958) - Yamane, Murata's friend
 Jazu musume ni eiko are (1958) - Masao
 Song for a Bride (1958)
 A Holiday in Tokyo (1958) - Jiro
 Doji o numana (1958)
 Romansu matsuri (1958)
 Jirochô gaiden: Haikagura kiso no himatsuri (1958)
 Gigantis, the Fire Monster (1959) - Shoichi Tsukioka
 Yajû shisubeshi (1959) - Detective Masugi
 Ginza no onêchan (1959)
 Yari hitosuji nihon bare (1959) - Shinsuke
 Sazae-san no dâssen okusamâ (1959)
 Sazae-san no akachan tanjo (1960)
 Ginza taikutsu musume (1960) - Takashi Koshiba
 Hawai Middowei daikaikûsen: Taiheiyô no arashi (1960)
 Daughters, Wives and a Mother (1960) - Hidetaka Tani
 Gambare! Bangaku (1960)
 Chikûho no kodomotachi (1960)
 Sazae-san to epuron obasan (1960)
 Ginza no koibitotachi (1961)
 Fuku no kami: Sazae-san ikka (1961)
 Honkon no yoru (1960)
 Mothra (1961) - Dr. Shinichi Chujo
 Futari no musuko (1961)
 Honkon No Hoshi (1962) - Haruyama
 Sôtome ke no musume tachi (1962) - Tatsurô Yoshimura
 47 Samurai (1962) - Gengo Ôtaka
 Kôkôsei to onna kyôshi: hijô no seishun (1962)
 Attack Squadron! (1963)
 Tsuma toiuna no onnatachi (1963)
 Matango (1963) - Naoyuki Sakuda
 Atragon (1963) - Detective Ito, Tokyo Metropolitan Police
 Kon'nichiwa akachan (1964) - Toshio Mikami
 Mothra vs. Godzilla (1964) - Professor Miura
 Dogara, the Space Monster (1964) - Kirino
 Ghidorah, the Three-Headed Monster (1964) - Professor Miura
 Kokkura suzumaru (1965)
 Honkon no shiroibara (1965)
 Bangkok no yoru (1966) - Kitajima
 Jinchoge (1966) - Maekawa
 Japan's Longest Day (1967) - Nobukata Wada - NHK Broadcaster
 Go! Go! Wakadaishô (1969) - Okamoto
 Furesshuman wakadaishô (1969)
 Battle of the Japan Sea (1969) - Kurino
 Sotsugyô ryokô (1973) - Kazuhiko Saito
 Godzilla vs. Mechagodzilla (1974) - Professor Wagura 
 Prophecies of Nostradamus (1974) - Environmental Scientist 2
 Zoku ningen kakumei (1976)
 Boryoku senshi (1979)
 The Return of Godzilla (1984) - Professor Minami
 Godzilla 1985 (1985) - Professor Minami
 Godzilla: Tokyo S.O.S. (2003) - Dr. Shinichi Chujo
 Zero Focus (2009)

Television
Ultra Q (1966) - Chief Airport Traffic Controller Kaneko
Onihei Hankachō (1975)

References

Sources

External links 
 

1926 births
2015 deaths
Deaths from pneumonia in Japan
Japanese male film actors
Keio University alumni
Male actors from Kanagawa Prefecture
20th-century Japanese male actors
21st-century Japanese male actors
People from Kamakura